Chelonoidis cubensis, also known as the Cuban giant tortoise, is an extinct species of land tortoise that lived in Cuba from the Late Pleistocene to the Early Holocene. It had a carapace length of between 40cm and 90cm. It is thought that the species went extinct through human exploitation.

Reference 

cubensis
Reptiles described in 1868
Fossil taxa described in 1868
Extinct turtles
Holocene extinctions